Caroline Kaufer (née Lipson) (August 4, 1962 – March 22, 2005) was an executive of a software development company and a philanthropist, especially for research into neuroendocrine cancer, the disease from which she died. Before her death, Mrs. Kaufer and her husband Stephen Kaufer gave $1.05 million to the Dana–Farber Cancer Institute to fund research of this rare disease. They also donated $250,000 to the Massachusetts General Hospital for similar research. The Stephen and Caroline Kaufer Fund for Neuroendocrine Research continues to support medical research around the world.

Kaufer was a graduate of Newton South High School (class of 1980), Harvard College (class 
of 1984) and Harvard Business School (class of 1988). She was head of Centerline Development Systems, based in Newton. Her husband managed and was co-founder of TripAdvisor. The money that they donated has been used for research at, among other places, Dana–Farber Cancer Institute, Massachusetts General Hospital and Stanford University.

References

External links
News release on TripAdvisor website 
Stanford Medical School
Dana–Farber Cancer Institute
"Caroline Lipson Kaufer died March 22 after a battle with neuroendocrine cancer. She was 42. " The Jewish Advocate April 7, 2005. 
American Society of Clinical Oncology
Ruder, Debra. "Curiosity, money, and a mother’s anguish help inspire neuroendocrine cancer research, Paths of Progress, Fall/Winter 2006, pp. 18-22. 
Proceedings of the National Academy of Sciences
Paresky, Susan S. "Kaufers’ generosity transforms into treatments for rare cancer", Impact Winter 2005 

1962 births
Massachusetts General Hospital benefactors
Harvard College alumni
2005 deaths
20th-century American philanthropists
Harvard Business School alumni
Newton South High School alumni